Euthyplociidae is a family of mayflies in the order Ephemeroptera. There are about 7 genera and more than 20 described species in Euthyplociidae.

Genera
These seven genera belong to the family Euthyplociidae:
 Afroplocia Lestage, 1939
 Campylocia Needham & Murphy, 1924
 Euthyplocia Eaton, 1871
 Exeuthyplocia Lestage, 1919
 Mesoplocia
 Polyplocia Lestage, 1921
 Proboscidoplocia Demoulin, 1966

References

Further reading

 
 
 
 

Mayflies
Insect families
Articles created by Qbugbot